Olha Kulynych (born 1 February 2000) is a Ukrainian professional racing cyclist, who currently rides for UCI Women's Continental Team . In October 2020, she rode in the women's edition of the 2020 Liège–Bastogne–Liège race in Belgium.

References

External links
 

2000 births
Living people
Ukrainian female cyclists
Cyclists at the 2018 Summer Youth Olympics
People from Bila Tserkva
Sportspeople from Kyiv Oblast